Arthur Edward George Themen (born 26 November 1939) is a British jazz saxophonist and formerly orthopaedic surgeon. Critic John Fordham has described him as "an appealing presence on the British jazz circuit for over 40 years.... Originally a Dexter Gordon and Sonny Rollins disciple ... Themen has proved himself remarkably attentive to the saxophone styles of subsequent generations."

Life and career
Themen was born in Manchester, England, where he was involved with the traditional jazz scene in the late 1950s as a self-taught musician, having started playing clarinet as a schoolboy at Manchester Grammar School. 

In 1958, he began his medical studies at the University of Cambridge. There Themen started playing jazz with the Cambridge University Jazz Group – with bandmates including Lionel Grigson, Dave Gelly, Dick Heckstall-Smith, Jonathan Lynn, and John Hart – the group under pianist Grigson's leadership achieving "near professional standard with a swinging hard-bop style that swept the board in the fiercely contested Inter-University Jazz Band Competitions".

In 1961 Themen went to complete his studies at St Mary's Hospital Medical School, Paddington, where he qualified in 1964; specialising in orthopaedic medicine, he eventually became a consultant. In London he played with blues musicians Jack Bruce and Alexis Korner, and was a member of Alexis Korner's Blues Incorporated. Themen has said: "I had pretty much decided that I could continue to practise medicine and play saxophone, and Alexis, being heavily into blues as well as taking in jazz influences like Charles Mingus, furthered my knowledge of music quite a lot." In 1965, Themen played with the Peter Stuyvesant Jazz Orchestra in Zürich, going on to play with such English luminaries as Michael Garrick, Ian Carr, and Graham Collier's Music.

In 1974, Themen entered on what was to be one of his central musical relationships when he started playing with Stan Tracey, and he has played with all of Tracey's groups, touring with him all over the world as well as around the UK. Themen has also played and toured with visiting US musicians, including Charlie Rouse, Nat Adderley, Red Rodney, George Coleman, and Al Haig.

He was featured in a profile on composer Graham Collier in the 1985 Channel 4 documentary 'Hoarded Dreams' 

In 1995, Themen formed a quartet with pianist John Critchinson.

Themen's style originally owed much to the influence of Dexter Gordon and Sonny Rollins, but later influences included such disparate saxophonists as Coleman Hawkins, Evan Parker, and the "sheets of sound" John Coltrane.

Themen was interviewed by Julian Joseph on BBC Radio 3's Jazz Line-Up on 22 November 2014 as a celebration of the saxophonist's 75th birthday. He revealed that he had originally played clarinet, but since page three of the tutor book was missing he had played for some time with the mouthpiece upside-down. He was inspired to play saxophone after he attended a gig by the Dankworth Seven, at the local Palais, at the age of 16, with a female cousin. The immaculately-dressed and manicured saxophonist Danny Moss winked at Themen's cousin and the instant effect this had convinced Themen that his future lay in the saxophone.

Following his retirement as a consultant orthopaedic surgeon, Themen has been focusing on his jazz career.

Discography
1975: Captain Adventure - Stan Tracey Quartet
1976: Under Milk Wood - Stan Tracey Quartet
1976: The Bracknell Connection - Stan Tracey Octet
1979: Expressly Ellington - Al Haig, Jamil Nasser and Art Themen
1980: South East Assignment - Stan Tracey Quartet
1981: The Crompton Suite - Stan Tracey Sextet
1982: Bebop "Live" – Al Haig, Peter King and Art Themen
1984: The Poets' Suite - Stan Tracey Quartet
1985: Now - Stan Tracey
1985: Live At Ronnie Scott's - Stan Tracey Hexad
1987: Genesis - Stan Tracey Orchestra
2008: The 3 Tenors at the Appleby Jazz Festival – Art Themen, Mornington Lockett and Don Weller (featuring Mark Edwards, Andrew Cleyndert and Spike Wells)
2019: Thane & The Villeins - Pete Whittaker, Art Themen, George Double.

With Graham Collier
New Conditions (Mosaic, 1976)
Symphony of Scorpions (Mosaic, 1977)
The Day of the Dead (Mosaic, 1978)
Hoarded Dreams (Cuneiform, 1983 [2007])

References

External links

 Art Themen at BBC Music
 Jack Kenny, "Art Themen at 80", Jazz Views, February 2020.

1939 births
Living people
Alumni of the University of Cambridge
English jazz alto saxophonists
British surgeons
Musicians from Manchester
British male saxophonists
20th-century saxophonists
20th-century British male musicians
21st-century saxophonists
21st-century British male musicians
British male jazz musicians
Alumni of St Mary's Hospital Medical School
People educated at Manchester Grammar School